The first season of CSI: Crime Scene Investigation premiered on CBS on October 6, 2000, and ended on May 17, 2001. The series stars William Petersen and Marg Helgenberger.

Plot
It's all change at the Las Vegas Crime Lab following the shooting death of Holly Gribbs ("Pilot"), yet the team still find themselves tasked with solving the bizarre, the brutal, and the impossible. Under the supervision of new Supervisor Gil Grissom, and his second-in-command Catherine Willows, the team investigate the suicide of a casino jackpot winner ("Cool Change"), the abduction and burial of a young woman ("Crate 'n Burial"), the discovery of a severed leg ("Pledging Mr. Johnson"), the murder of a Catholic school dean ("Friends & Lovers"), the discovery of a skeleton under the house ("Who are You?"), a murder on an airliner ("Unfriendly Skies"), the stabbing deaths of an entire family ("Blood Drops"), and a series of staged suicides ("Anonymous"). Meanwhile, Brown struggles with a gambling addiction, Sidle adjusts to life in Las Vegas, and Brass reacquaints himself with the Homicide squad.

Cast

Changes
Jorja Fox joins the main cast in the second episode.

Main cast
 
 William Petersen as CSI Level 3 Night Shift Supervisor Dr. Gil Grissom
 Marg Helgenberger as CSI Level 3 Assistant Night Shift Supervisor Catherine Willows
 Gary Dourdan as CSI Level 3 Warrick Brown 
 George Eads as CSI Level 3 Nick Stokes
 Jorja Fox as CSI Level 3 Sara Sidle (episodes 2–23)
 Paul Guilfoyle as LVPD Homicide Unit Captain Jim Brass

Recurring cast

 Eric Szmanda as DNA Technician Greg Sanders
 Robert David Hall as Clark County Coroner's Office Chief Medical Examiner Dr. Al Robbins
 Skip O'Brien as LVPD Homicide Detective Sergeant Ray O'Riley
 David Berman as Clark County Coroner's Office Assistant Medical Examiner Dr. David Phillips
 Glenn Morshower as Clark County Sheriff Brian Mobley
 Judith Scott as Clark County Coroner's Office Medical Examiner Dr. Jenna Williams
 Madison McReynolds as Lindsey Willows
 Pamela Gidley as Consultant Forensic Anthropologist Specialist Teri Miller
 Joseph Patrick Kelly as LVPD Officer Joe Metcalf
 Gerald McCullouch as Ballistics Expert Bobby Dawson
 Marc Vann as CSI Day Shift Supervisor Conrad Ecklie

 Krista Allen as Kristy Hopkins
 Timothy Carhart as Eddie Willows
 Matt O'Toole as Paul Millander
 Sheeri Rappaport as Fingerprint Technician Mandy Webster
 Eric Stonestreet as Questionable Documents Technician Ronnie Litre
 Chandra West as CSI Level 1 Holly Gribbs
 Tony Amendola as Forensic Document Examiner Professor Rambar
 Brigid Brannagh as Tammy Felton
 Susan Gibney as Charlotte Meridian
 Aldis Hodge as Tony Thorpe, a.k.a. The Parking Garage Rapist.
 Geoffrey Rivas as LVPD Homicide Detective Sam Vega

Episodes

Format 
This is the only season of the CSI franchise that was broadcast in the 4:3 aspect ratio. It was, however, filmed in 16:9, and the widescreen versions of the episodes are present on the Blu-ray release.

References

External links 
 DVD Release Dates at TVShowsOnDVD.com

01
2000 American television seasons
2001 American television seasons